Spongilla prespensis is freshwater sponge endemic to Lake Prespa. The sponge lives in rocky places in the lake.

References

Spongillidae
Endemic fauna of the Balkans
Freshwater animals of Europe
Animals described in 1953